Rockwood/East 188th Avenue is a MAX light rail station in Gresham, Oregon. It serves the Blue Line and is the 21st stop eastbound on the eastside MAX branch. The station is at the intersection of Southeast 188th Avenue and Burnside Street, within the Rockwood neighborhood. This station is a hub for bus service to Gateway Transit Center and Gresham Transit Center.

Until 2010, this station had staggered side platforms; however, the two platforms are now adjacent, both located to the west of SE 188th Avenue.  A new eastbound platform was constructed, and the original westbound platform was rebuilt – with passengers using a temporary wooden platform east of 188th during the construction. The rebuilt station has more modern fixtures, improved security features, and 58-foot high artwork entitled Rockwood Sunrise. It opened in May 2011.

The station was located in TriMet fare zone 4 from its opening in 1986 until September 1988, and in zone 3 from then until September 2012, at which time TriMet discontinued all use of zones in its fare structure.

Bus line connections
The following bus routes serve this station:
25 – Glisan/Rockwood 
87 – Airport Way/181st Avenue

References

External links
Station information (with westbound ID number) from TriMet
Station information (with eastbound ID number) from TriMet
MAX Light Rail Stations – more general TriMet page

MAX Light Rail stations
MAX Blue Line
Buildings and structures in Gresham, Oregon
1986 establishments in Oregon
Railway stations in the United States opened in 1986
Railway stations in Multnomah County, Oregon